The Limping Man may refer to:

 The Limping Man (play), a 1931 play by William Matthew Scott
 The Limping Man (1936 film), a British film adaptation of the play directed by Walter Summers
 The Limping Man (1953 film), a British film directed by Cy Endfield